Robert 'Bob' Lynn Williams (born September 10, 1951 in Clarksburg, West Virginia) is an American politician and a Democratic member of the West Virginia Senate representing District 14 from January 2009 until his defeat by Randy Smith in 2016.

Education
Williams earned his BS from Fairmont State College (now Fairmont State University) and his MS from West Virginia University.

Elections
2012 Williams was unopposed for the May 8, 2012 Democratic Primary, winning with 9,508 votes, and was unopposed for the November 6, 2012 General election, winning with 27,690 votes.
2008 When District 14 Democratic Senator Jon Blair Hunter left the Legislature and left a district seat open, Williams won the May 13, 2008 Democratic Primary with 9,655 votes (55.7%), and won the November 4, 2008 General election with 22,205 votes (51.3%) against Republican nominee Gary Howell, who was elected to the West Virginia House of Delegates in 2010.

References

External links
Official page at the West Virginia Legislature

Robert Williams at Ballotpedia
Bob Williams at the National Institute on Money in State Politics

1951 births
Living people
Fairmont State University alumni
Politicians from Clarksburg, West Virginia
People from Grafton, West Virginia
Democratic Party West Virginia state senators
West Virginia University alumni
21st-century American politicians